Jakub Plšek (born 13 December 1993) is a professional Czech football midfielder currently playing for Puskás Akadémia FC in the Nemzeti Bajnokság I.

He made his league debut on 6 October 2012 in a 1–0 Czech First League away win at FK Mladá Boleslav, against whom he also scored his first league goal on 21 April 2013. On 18 October 2016, he scored five goals in a Czech National Football League 7–0 home rout of Prostějov. He finished the 2016–17 National Football League season with a tally of 18 goals in 28 matches, becoming the league's top scorer. He won the Czech National Football League Best Player award in 2017.

References

External links
 
 Jakub Plšek official international statistics
 
 Jakub Plšek profile on the SK Sigma Olomouc official website

1993 births
Living people
Czech footballers
Czech Republic youth international footballers
Czech Republic under-21 international footballers
Czech National Football League players
Czech First League players
SK Sigma Olomouc players
Association football midfielders
Puskás Akadémia FC players
Nemzeti Bajnokság I players
Expatriate footballers in Hungary
Czech expatriate sportspeople in Hungary
Czech expatriate footballers
People from Zlín District
Sportspeople from the Zlín Region